The 1975 Austrian Grand Prix was a Formula One motor race held at Österreichring on 17 August 1975. It was race 12 of 14 in both the 1975 World Championship of Drivers and the 1975 International Cup for Formula One Manufacturers. It was the eighth Austrian Grand Prix and the sixth to be held at the Österreichring. It was held over 29 of the scheduled 54 laps of the six kilometre circuit for a race distance of 171 kilometres. The race was shortened by heavy rain, meaning that only half points were awarded. The weekend itself was marred by the deaths of Mark Donohue and a track marshal in a practice crash.

Mastering the wet weather, the race was won by Italian driver Vittorio Brambilla driving a March 751. It was Brambilla's only Formula One win in his seven-year Grand Prix career. He took a 27-second win over British driver James Hunt in his Hesketh 308. Eight seconds further back was the Shadow DN5 of British driver Tom Pryce in the first of just two podiums in his abbreviated career.

Qualifying summary 

Niki Lauda delighted his home crowd by claiming his seventh pole position of the year. Rolf Stommelen returned after his crash in Spain but could only muster 26th position for qualifying. Chris Amon had returned for Ensign but only being able to qualify in 24th. Brett Lunger qualified well in his début for Hesketh to start 17th.

Practice crashes 
Practice was marred by a series of accidents, Brian Henton crashing his Lotus when he hit an oil patch and Wilson Fittipaldi breaking two bones in his hand. During the warm-up on Sunday morning, Mark Donohue had a tyre failure and crashed at Vöest-Hügel, the flat-out right hander after the pits. The car went through catch fencing and advertising billboards lining the track. One track marshal was killed and another marshall was injured. Donohue was injured but suffered a brain hemorrhage after the accident and died two days later.

Race summary 
As the grid formed up, there were reports of rain at the far side of the track. Thunderclouds were forming ominously and the cars were returned to the pits to change to wet tyres.

After 45 minutes, the grid reformed. Lauda led off the start from James Hunt and Patrick Depailler who had shot up from the fourth row. Mario Andretti spun off, whilst Bob Evans retired the BRM.

Vittorio Brambilla had shot through the spray to gain a third place, with Ronnie Peterson leaping from tenth to fourth.

By lap 12, it was obvious that Lauda's car was not set up fully to cope with wet conditions and by lap 15 Hunt stormed by to lead for the fifth time this season. However, this was to be short-lived. The Hesketh's engine was running on only seven cylinders and Brambilla was clambering all over the back of the car. Ahead of them Lunger was driving carefully in his first wet race and could not see the leaders approaching him. Brambilla seized the lead and it took a further two laps for Hunt to finally pass his teammate. Peterson had to pit to replace a faulty visor, whilst the Brabham drivers found they had been racing with one of their own rear tyres and one of their teammates'. Jochen Mass spun out of third place, and soon there was frantic activity between the Grand Prix Drivers' Association and the race officials as to whether the race should continue – it was brought to a halt on lap 29.

As Brambilla took the flag, he crashed into the barriers and the March team celebrated a historic victory. However, behind the scenes, there was confusion. Some teams were preparing for a restart, but as the race had been stopped with a chequered flag only, this could not happen. The race results would stand, but with only half points awarded. Brambilla, the oldest man in the field at 37, had won his first Grand Prix.

This was the first of only two races where Shadow used a Matra engine instead of the Cosworth DFV in Jean-Pierre Jarier's Shadow DN7.

With neither Carlos Reutemann nor Emerson Fittipaldi featuring in the points, Niki Lauda's sixth position actually allowed him to expand his points lead to 17.5 points. If Lauda scored any points at all at the Italian Grand Prix the Austrian driver could claim the championship.

Classification

Qualifying 

*Positions in red indicate entries that failed to qualify.

Race

Championship standings after the race

Drivers' Championship standings

Constructors' Championship standings

Note: Only the top five positions are included for both sets of standings. Only the best 6 results from the first 7 races and the best 6 results from the last 7 races counted towards the Championship. Numbers without parentheses are Championship points; numbers in parentheses are total points scored.

References

Austrian Grand Prix
Grand Prix
Austrian Grand Prix
European Grand Prix